Proslav is a neighbourhood of Plovdiv, southern Bulgaria. It was a village up to 1969 when it was incorporated into Plovdiv along with Komatevo. The most convenient road to Plovdiv is the Peshtera Highway. Another major transport link is Sofia-Plovdiv highway.

Neighbourhoods in Plovdiv